Russell Gomer is a Welsh actor who has worked extensively in television roles. He is best known for playing Yanto in the Sky1 TV comedy drama series Stella.

Filmography

TV

Ain't Seen Ruthin Yet

In 2010 Gomer released an internet video musical parody in response to the success of the Newport parody Newport (Ymerodraeth State of Mind). The song called 'Ain't Seen Ruthin Yet' referenced the North Wales town of Ruthin to the tune of the Bachman-Turner Overdrive rock classic 'You Ain't Seen Nothing Yet. Gomer released the video under the name of spoof actor David Garland Jones, a comedy creation of writer Jon Tregenna. As David Garland Jones he subsequently released a 13-song video.

References

External links
 

Living people
Welsh male television actors
People from Pontypridd
Year of birth missing (living people)